The 2021 season was Biratnagar City's 1st Nepal Super League season in 2021.

Season overview

On 18 March, Biratnagar City announced the signing of Nepal national football team defender Ranjit Dhimal as its marquee player.

On the auction of Nepal Super League, Biratnagar City acquired various players such as midfielder Sunil Bal, Bijal Dhimal, Hem Tamang, etc.

On 14 April, Biratnagar City signed contract with three foreign players, Spanish forward Pedro Manzi, Nigerian forward Adelaja Somide and Cameroonian defender Ulrich Siewe.

Competition

Nepal Super League

Results

League table

Statistics

Goalscorers 
Includes all competitive matches. The list is sorted alphabetically by surname when total goals are equal.

References

External links
Nepal Super League 2021

Nepalese football clubs 2021 season
Nepal Super League